Fredrik Michalsen (born 15 September 1996) is a Norwegian football midfielder who currently plays for IF Fløya.

Michalsen attended the Norwegian College of Elite Sport in Tromsø, and trained with Tromsø IL's first team through most of 2015. He was then officially drafted into the senior team, and made his debut in May 2016 against Stabæk. On 1 August 2017 Michalsen went on loan to the Iceland club Fjölnir for the rest of the season.

In 2018 he quit Tromsø and joined childhood club IF Fløya.

Career statistics

References

1996 births
Living people
Sportspeople from Tromsø
Norwegian footballers
Norwegian expatriate footballers
Tromsø IL players
Eliteserien players
Expatriate footballers in Iceland
Association football midfielders